Ross Lowis Mangles VC (14 April 1833 – 28 February 1905) was a recipient of the Victoria Cross, the highest and most prestigious award for gallantry in the face of the enemy that can be awarded to British and Commonwealth forces.  Mangles is one of only five civilians to be awarded the VC.

Details
Mangles was the son of Ross Donnelly Mangles. He was educated at Windlesham House School, Brighton (1842–43), Bath Grammar School and East India Company College (1851–52). He took up a place in the Bengal Civil Service in 1853. He was 24 years old, and a civilian in the Bengal Civil Service during the Indian Mutiny when the following deed took place at Arrah for which he was awarded the VC:

His Victoria Cross is displayed at the National Army Museum, Chelsea, England.

He is buried in Brookwood Cemetery. On the north wall of St Michael and All Angels Church, Pirbright is a brass memorial to Mangles. The oaks on the plaque represent England, his native land; the palms are for India, scene of his life's work; his passion for growing roses after his retirement is also commemorated.

References

External links
 Location of grave and VC medal (Brookwood Cemetery)
 The Brookwood Cemetery Society (Known holders of the Victoria Cross commemorated in Brookwood Cemetery)
 Ross L. Mangles VC
 Welcome to St Michael and All Angels Church, Pirbright

British recipients of the Victoria Cross
Administrators in British India
1833 births
1905 deaths
Indian Rebellion of 1857 recipients of the Victoria Cross
Burials at Brookwood Cemetery
Military personnel from Kolkata
People educated at Windlesham House School